An employment counsellor advises, coaches, provides information to, and supports people who are planning, seeking and managing their career and life/work direction. Traditionally, employment counselors help their clients deal with vocational decisions concerning choice, changes in, or adjustment to work.

Working conditions
Employment Counselors generally focus on the acquisition of work, actually getting a job, which is the desired result of the career development, training and education process. They work in government offices (One Stop Career Centers), community based organizations, for profit and non profit businesses that are engaged in helping people find jobs. Salary and Working Conditions are quite diverse.  Employment Counseling has its historical roots with the US Department of Labor. 
Career development professionals may work in a variety of settings but usually work in offices where they can conduct private interviews with clients and in classrooms or boardrooms where they conduct group sessions. Depending on the organization, their hours of work may include some evening and weekend work.

Educational requirements 
Most career development professionals have post-secondary education in a related discipline such as psychology, education, social work or human resources development. Increasingly, employers are looking for applicants who have a certificate, diploma or degree in career development, or an equivalent combination of education and experience.

See also
Career development
Career Guide
Enneagram of Personality
Holland Codes
Job hunting
Myers-Briggs Type Indicator
Occupational Outlook Handbook
Personality psychology
Standard Occupational Classification System

References

Career advice services
Community and social services occupations
Education and training occupations